Legislative elections were held in Israel on 1 November 2022 to elect the 120 members of the 25th Knesset. The results saw the right-wing national camp of former prime minister Benjamin Netanyahu win a parliamentary majority, amid losses for left-wing and Arab parties, as well as gains by the far right.

After the 2021 elections, the next elections had been scheduled for no later than 11 November 2025 according to the four-year term limit set by Basic Law: The Government. The thirty-sixth government, a national unity government formed between eight political parties following the 2021 elections, held the narrowest possible majority (61 seats) in the 120-member Knesset. In April 2022, MK Idit Silman left the governing coalition, leaving it without a majority.

On 20 June 2022, following several legislative defeats for the government in the Knesset, prime minister Naftali Bennett and alternate prime minister Yair Lapid announced the introduction of a bill to dissolve the 24th Knesset, which was approved on 30 June. Simultaneously, in accordance with the rotation government agreement that was part of the 2021 coalition deal, Lapid became prime minister and leads a caretaker government until a new government took office.

Within the context of the 2018–2022 Israeli political crisis, this was the fifth Knesset election in nearly four years, as no party had been able to form a stable coalition since 2019. A total of 40 parties registered to run for these elections, although only twelve to fourteen parties were projected to cross the 3.25% electoral threshold to win seats under the closed list, proportional representation electoral system. Ten parties succeeded in crossing the threshold. On 21 December, Netanyahu announced that he had succeeded in forming a coalition government consisting of 64 MKs. The thirty-seventh government was sworn in on 29 December.

Background 

The extended period of political deadlock that led up to the election was the result of four inconclusive elections (April 2019, September 2019, 2020, and 2021). In April and September 2019, neither incumbent Prime Minister of Israel, Benjamin Netanyahu, nor leader of the main opposition party Blue and White, Benny Gantz, was able to muster a 61-seat governing majority, leading to fresh elections. In March 2020, these resulted in the formation of a unity government, the thirty-fifth government of Israel, between Netanyahu and Gantz, which collapsed in December following a budgetary dispute, leading to another election in March 2021. The 2021 election led to the formation of another unity government, this one between eight political parties, with the leader of the Yamina party, Naftali Bennett, and the leader of Yesh Atid, Yair Lapid, becoming prime minister and Alternate Prime Minister of Israel, respectively. Bennett and Lapid agreed to rotate their positions after two years, with Lapid becoming the prime minister and Bennett becoming the alternate prime minister.

Upon the government's formation in June 2021, it held 61 seats in the Knesset; all these members of the Knesset (MK) came from coalition parties excluding Yamina's Amichai Chikli. On 6 April 2022, Yamina MK Idit Silman, resigned from the coalition, causing the governing coalition to lose its majority in the Knesset. Silman cited a decision from Minister of Health, Nitzan Horowitz, to enforce a court ruling allowing hospital visitors to enter with chametz (leavened bread) during Passover, which is forbidden under Jewish law, and other religion-related actions of the coalition. On 19 May, Meretz MK Ghaida Rinawie Zoabi resigned from the coalition, alleging that the government had adopted a hardline stance on the Israeli–Palestinian conflict and related issues, and lowering its number of seats in the Knesset to a minority of 59. She rejoined the coalition three days later. On 7 June, she joined the opposition in voting down a bill that would have renewed the application of Israeli law in the West Bank settlements, which was set to expire in July. The bill was supported by the government. On 13 June, Yamina MK Nir Orbach left the coalition, arguing that left-wing members of the coalition were holding it hostage.

On 20 June, Bennett and Lapid announced the introduction of a bill to dissolve the Knesset in a joint statement, stating that Lapid would become the interim prime minister following the dissolution. The dissolution of the Knesset automatically delayed the expiration date of the ordinances until 90 days after the formation of the next government. The bill to dissolve the Knesset passed its first reading on 28 June. The bill passed its third reading on 29 June and the date for elections was set for 1 November 2022. Bennett opted to retire from politics and not seek reelection; he resigned as the leader of Yamina on 29 June, and was succeeded by Ayelet Shaked.

On 30 June, in accordance with the coalition agreement, Lapid succeeded Bennett as the caretaker prime minister.

Campaign 

On 10 July, Blue and White and New Hope formed a joint list, known as Blue and White – The New Hope, excluding Derekh Eretz that ran as part of New Hope in 2021. On 14 August, the list was joined by former Israel Defense Forces's Chief of the General Staff, Gadi Eizenkot, as well as Yamina MKs Matan Kahana and Shirly Pinto, and was subsequently renamed the National Unity Party.

On 27 July, Yamina formed a joint list with Derekh Eretz, known as Zionist Spirit. The alliance dissolved on 11 September. On 13 September, Yamina announced a joint run with The Jewish Home. that day, Derekh Eretz withdrew from the race.

On 14 September, the Religious Zionist Party, Noam and Otzma Yehudit submitted a single list.

On 15 September, several minutes before the party list submission deadline, the Joint List dissolved, with Balad and Hadash–Ta'al submitting two separate lists.

In August, Israel launched Operation Breaking Dawn, resulting in clashes between Israeli forces and Palestinian groups. The operation was supported by members of the opposition, including Netanyahu, Religious Zionist Party leader Bezalel Smotrich, and Shas leader Aryeh Deri.

Timeline
 1 September — Deadline for submitting an application for registration of a new party to the Registrar of Parties for the purpose of running in this election
 11 September — Publication of the final list of parties running
 14–15 September — Date of submission of the lists of candidates to the Election Committee
 22 September — Deadline for filing a petition requesting disqualification of a list or candidate from running
 18 October — Beginning of television and radio advertising window
 1 November — Election date
 9 November — Deadline for the publication of the final election results
 15 November – 25th Knesset sworn in

Electoral system 

The 120 seats in the Knesset are elected by closed list, proportional representation in a single nationwide constituency. The electoral threshold for the election is 3.25%. In the Israeli-occupied territories, only the settlers have the right to vote.

Surplus-vote agreements 

Two parties could sign a surplus vote agreement that allowed them to compete for leftover seats as if they were running together on the same list, a system known as apparentment. The Bader–Ofer method slightly favours larger lists, meaning that alliances are more likely to receive leftover seats than parties would be individually. If the alliance were to receive leftover seats, the Bader–Ofer calculation would be applied privately to determine how the seats are divided among the two allied lists.

The following lists signed surplus vote-sharing agreements for the 2022 election:
 Labor and Meretz
 Likud and Religious Zionism
 National Unity Party and Yesh Atid
 Shas and United Torah Judaism
 Pirate Party of Israel and Yesh Kivun

Political parties

Factions before the election 

The table below lists the parliamentary factions represented in the 24th Knesset.

Retiring incumbents 
The table below lists all members of the Knesset (MK) who did not stand for re-election.

Contesting parties 

Forty parties initially submitted lists to participate in the elections, however, one party withdrew, leaving 39 parties. Among these, were the following:

 Ale Yarok
Balad
Economic Freedom Party
Fiery Youth
Free Democratic Israel
Ihud Bnei HaBrit
Hadash–Ta'al
Labor
Likud
Meretz
National Unity
New Economic Party
Pirate Party
Religious Zionism
Shas
The Jewish Home
United Arab List
United Torah Judaism
Yesh Atid
Yisrael Beiteinu

Not running
Derekh Eretz dropped out of the race on 13 September 2022.

Leadership elections and primaries
Leadership elections were held by some parties to determine party leadership ahead of the election. Primary elections were held by some parties in advance of the national election to determine the composition of their party list.

Balad
Balad party leader Sami Abu Shehadeh gained another term as party leader in a vote held by party members on 6 August.

Hadash
Hadash held its party primary on 13 August. Party head Ayman Odeh was re-elected.

Labor

The leadership primary for the Israeli Labor Party was held on 18 July, where party leader Merav Michaeli defeated party secretary general Eran Hermoni in a historic consecutive win by a party leader.

The Israeli Labor Party primaries took place on 9 August.

Likud
Benjamin Netanyahu did not face a challenge for the party leadership. Likud MK Yuli Edelstein, a former health minister and speaker of the Knesset, had initially stated an intent to challenge Netanyahu in 2021 but announced in late June 2022 that he would not do so. Netanyahu last faced an internal leadership challenge in 2019, when he defeated Gideon Sa'ar by a large margin; Sa'ar then left the Likud in 2020 to form New Hope. The planned leadership primary was cancelled on 19 July, as no one besides Netanyahu contested it.

Likud is one of several Israeli parties that allows its membership to determine a portion of the party's electoral list. The Likud's electoral list is composed of candidates selected by four methods: national primary elections, regional representatives (chosen from 10 regions), slots set aside for minorities, and slots filled by the party leader (Netanyahu). The primaries took place on 10 August. Contenders included Netanyahu's economic advisor Avi Simhon, far-right former MK Moshe Feiglin, and former MK Ayoob Kara. A Likud party committee moved the minority slot to a low position on the party list (No. 44), making it unlikely that the candidate selected to fill the slot would be elected. This move angered the Druze, including Likud MK Fateen Mulla, who currently fills the Likud minority seat.

Meretz

Yair Golan announced on 6 July that he would run in the Meretz leadership  primary and challenge incumbent Nitzan Horowitz. Horowitz announced on 12 July that he would not run in the leadership election. Former party leader Zehava Gal-On announced on 19 July that she will also run.

The election committee of the party selected 23 August as the date for the party primary and the leadership primary. Gal-On defeated Golan, returning to her former position as Meretz leader.

Religious Zionist
The Religious Zionist Party held its primaries digitally on 23 August. The candidate deadline was 2 August.

Ta'al
Ta'al held its party primary on 27 August. Party leader Ahmad Tibi was re-elected.

United Arab List
Mansour Abbas was approved for another term as the party leader of the United Arab List on 6 August.

Opinion polls 

This graph shows the polling trends from the 2021 Israeli legislative election until the next election day using a 4-poll moving average. Scenario polls are not included here. For parties not crossing the electoral threshold (currently 3.25%) in any given poll, the number of seats is calculated as a percentage of the 120 total seats.

Results 

The official body administering the elections, the Central Election Committee for the 25th Knesset, released the final official results of the elections on 9 November and the chairman of the committee, Supreme Court Justice Yitzhak Amit, presented them to the President Herzog.

The official results showed that of 6,788,804 total eligible voters, 4,794,593 cast their ballots, representing a 70.63% turnout rate. 0.62% were declared invalid or spoiled. The detailed breakdown of results is as follows:

Members of the Knesset who lost their seats

Aftermath 

With 86% of the vote counted, the right-wing bloc led by Benjamin Netanyahu, known in Israel as the national camp, was forecasted to win a majority of seats at 65, while both leftist Meretz and Balad parties were under the electoral threshold. As all the votes were counted, they remained under the threshold; far-right parties saw a surge in their vote share. In terms of votes, both blocs were neck-and-neck, with the anti-Netanyahu bloc achieving 49.5% but not gaining enough seats due to Meretz and Balad narrowly missing the electoral threshold, as 289,000 anti-Netanyahu votes went wasted in terms of seats share. Orly Ades, head of Israel's election panel Central Elections Committee, said Netanyahu's party Likud tried to undermine voting supervision, and described their actions as "something we've never seen before".

Netanyahu's bloc went on to win 64 seats, while the coalition led by the incumbent prime minister Yair Lapid won 51 seats. In addition to Meretz and Balad, the right-wing party The Jewish Home also failed to cross the electoral threshold. The new majority has been variously described as the most right-wing government in Israeli history, as well as its most religious government.

Lapid conceded to Netanyahu, and congratulated him, wishing him luck "for the sake of the Israeli people". Netanyahu received congratulatory messages from leaders around the world, including those of Canada, France, Hungary, India, Italy, Jordan, Sudan, Ukraine, the United Arab Emirates, the United States, and the United Kingdom, among others.

On 15 November, the swearing-in ceremony for the newly elected members of the 25th Knesset was held during the opening session. The incoming Knesset includes 29 female lawmakers, 7 less than the last Knesset, and 28 new parliamentarians. The vote to appoint a new Speaker of the Knesset, which is usually conducted at the opening session, and the swearing in of cabinet members were postponed since ongoing coalition negotiations had not yet resulted in agreement on these positions.

The vote to replace incumbent Knesset speaker Mickey Levy was scheduled for 13 December, after Likud and its allies secured the necessary number of signatures for it. Yariv Levin of Likud was elected as a temporary  speaker by 64 votes, while his opponents Meirav Ben-Ari of Yesh Atid and Ayman Odeh of Hadash got 45 and five votes respectively. He resigned on 29 December and Amir Ohana of Likud was elected as the speaker by 63 votes.

Government formation 

On 3 November 2022, Netanyahu told his aide Yariv Levin to begin informal coalition talks with allied parties after 97% of the vote was counted.

Netanyahu himself started holding talks on 6 November. He first met with Moshe Gafni, the leader of the Degel HaTorah faction of United Torah Judaism, and then with Yitzhak Goldknopf, the leader of the United Torah Judaism alliance and its Agudat Yisrael faction. Meanwhile, the Religious Zionist Party leader Bezalel Smotrich and the leader of its Otzma Yehudit faction Itamar Ben-Gvir pledged that they would not enter the coalition without the other faction. Gafni later met with Smotrich for coalition talks. Smotrich then met with Netanyahu. On 7 November, Netanyahu met with Ben-Gvir. A major demand among all of Netanyahu's allies was that the Knesset be allowed to override the rulings of the Supreme Court. Netanyahu met with the Noam faction leader and its sole MK Avi Maoz on 8 November.

Israeli President Isaac Herzog began consultations with heads of all political parties on 9 November after the election results were certified. Shas met with Likud for coalition talks on 10 November. By 11 November, Netanyahu had secured recommendations from 64 MKs, which constituted a majority. He was given the mandate to form the thirty-seventh government of Israel by President Herzog on 13 November. Otzma Yehudit and Noam officially split from Religious Zionism on 20 November as per a pre-election agreement.

Likud signed a coalition agreement with Otzma Yehudit on 25 November. with Noam on 27 November, the Religious Zionist Party on 1 December, United Torah Judaism on 6 December, and with Shas on 8 December.

Netanyahu asked Herzog for a 14-day extension after the agreement with Shas in order to finalise the roles his allied parties would play. Herzog on 9 December extended the deadline to 21 December. On that date, Netanyahu informed Herzog that he had succeeded in forming a coalition. The coalition government was sworn-in on 29 December.

See also 
 2022 in Israel
 List of elections in 2022

Notes

References

External links

 Elections for the 25th Knesset at the Israeli Central Elections Committee
 News and commentary at Google News

legislative
Legislative elections in Israel
Israel
Benjamin Netanyahu